George Rush Jr. and Joanna Molloy are a husband and wife team of American gossip columnists whose column, "Rush & Molloy", appeared in the New York Daily News from 1995 to 2010. Their memoir, Scandal: A Manual, was published by Skyhorse in 2013.

Molloy graduated from the University of California, Berkeley and was previously editor of the Page Six column of the New York Post. Rush graduated from Brown University and earned a graduate degree in journalism from Columbia University. The two were married in 1992.

References

External links
 of George Rush
Works by Joana Molloy at New York Daily News

Living people
American gossip columnists
Married couples
New York Daily News people
Columns (periodical)
Writing duos
Year of birth missing (living people)